Forman Glacier is a tributary glacier,  long, flowing east to enter Shackleton Glacier between Mount Franke and Mount Cole, in the Queen Maud Mountains of Antarctica. It was named by the Advisory Committee on Antarctic Names after John H. Forman, Construction Mechanic, U.S. Navy, a member of the McMurdo Station winter party, 1959.

References 

Glaciers of Dufek Coast